Erard II may refer to:

 Erard II, Count of Brienne (died in 1191)
 Erard II of Chacenay (died in 1236)
 Erard II von der Mark (1365–1440)